Ricardo Zúñiga is the Principal Deputy Assistant Secretary in the Bureau of Western Hemisphere Affairs, U.S. Department of State.

Zúñiga was appointed as Special Envoy for the Northern Triangle on 22 March  2021. According to the United States Department of State. The Special Envoy will engage with regional governments, including but not limited to Mexico,  El Salvador, Guatemala, and Honduras, on a range of issues in order to seek to improve conditions in Central America. He also will hold our partners accountable for their commitments to address root causes of migration and the increase in arrivals of unaccompanied children at the U.S. southern border.

In August 2021, he was appointed Principal Deputy Assistant Secretary in the Bureau of Western Hemisphere Affairs. He succeeded Julie Chung as acting Assistant Secretary of State for Western Hemisphere Affairs until President Biden's nominee, Brian A. Nichols, was confirmed in the Senate.

From 2015 to 2018, he was the U.S. Consul General serving at Sao Paulo, Brazil. From 2012 to 2015, he served as Special Assistant to the President and Senior Director for Western Hemisphere Affairs at the National Security Council. He also played a key role in normalizing relations with Cuba.

References

External links 

Living people
Year of birth missing (living people)
21st-century American diplomats